Sarratea is a railway station located in the north of the city of Rosario, Santa Fe, Argentina. Although no longer active, the station is currently managed by private company Nuevo Central Argentino, which operates the line for freight services.

History 
The station was opened about 1890 by the Buenos Aires and Rosario Railway, a company that would be absorbed by the Central Argentine Railway in 1908. The railway ran north from the Patio Parada node and proceeded towards the city of Santa Fe, capital of the province. The station was named after Manuel de Sarratea, an Argentine diplomat, politician and soldier who took part of the May Revolution and was Governor of Buenos Aires Province (1820).

After the entire Argentine railway network was nationalised in 1948, the station become part of the General Bartolomé Mitre Railway division of recently created Ferrocarriles Argentinos. In 1977 Sarratea station was closed, as almost all passenger services were eliminated. Like other stations of the former Ferrocarril Mitre, it is now maintained by freight rail company Nuevo Central Argentino (NCA).

Operators 

Notes

References

Railway stations in Rosario, Santa Fe
Railway stations opened in 1890
Railway stations closed in 1977
Defunct railway stations in Argentina